Conor Stephen Townsend (born 4 March 1993) is an English professional footballer who plays as a defender for  club West Bromwich Albion.

He began his career with Hull City, from whom he had loan spells with Grimsby Town, Chesterfield, Carlisle United, Dundee United and Scunthorpe United before joining the latter permanently in 2016.

At the start of the 2018/19 season Conor Townsend joined West Brom for £756,000.

Club career

Hull City 
Townsend came through the youth ranks at Hull City after joining the club at the age of eight, and was promoted to the club's first team during the 2011–12 season. 

Townsend's breakthrough of sorts, at the start of the 2013–14 season, occurred when he made his Hull City debut on 27 August 2013, coming on as 55th-minute substitute in a League Cup game against Leyton Orient.

He signed a one-year contract extension with Hull in June 2015.

4 years on loan 
He joined Grimsby Town on loan on 25 October 2011, initially for one month. He made his debut on 29 October, playing in a 5–0 win against Ashington in the fourth qualifying round of the FA Cup, and was named man-of-the-match. He made his league debut on 5 November, playing the full 90 minutes of a 2–2 draw against Bath City. After making 5 appearances, his loan was extended by a further month. On 29 December, the loan was extended until the end of the season. He scored his first professional goal, from a free kick, in a 2–1 win against Forest Green Rovers. He made 27 league appearances, as well as five in the FA Cup. At the end of the 2011–12 season Townsend was awarded the club's "Supporters Young Player of the Season" award.

On 20 November 2012, he joined Chesterfield on a month-long loan. He made his debut on 15 December, replacing Jay O'Shea after 85 minutes of a 1–1 draw at home to Burton Albion. On 29 December, he scored his first goal for Chesterfield and was then sent off later in the game, during a 1–1 draw against Morecambe. The loan was eventually extended to the end of the season. In total, he played 20 games for Chesterfield and scored once. On 29 April, his loan deal ended and he returned to Hull City.

After making his first appearance for Hull, Townsend moved on a month-long loan to Carlisle United on 2 September 2013. The loan was extended for two months on 26 September 2013. Here, he played twelve league games, three FA Cup games and two Football League Trophy games. He was sent off in a 0–0 draw against Rotherham United.

Townsend moved to Dundee United on loan in July 2014. He made his debut on 10 August 2014, as Dundee United beat Aberdeen 3–0 in the opening game of the 2014–15 season. Following transfer deadline day moves he returned to Hull City early on 3 February 2015.

On 28 February 2015, Townsend joined Scunthorpe United on a month-long loan, which was later extended to the end of the season. He debuted the same day, in a 0–0 draw against Yeovil Town. He played six times for Scunthorpe, before going back to Hull.

Having signed a one-year contract extension with Hull in 2015, Townsend was again loaned to Grimsby Town, joining for one month on 12 October 2015. This was later extended until 1 January 2016. He scored twice, once in a 5–1 win against St Albans, in the FA Cup and again in a 3–1 win against Welling United, in the league.

Scunthorpe United 
On 6 January 2016, Townsend signed for Scunthorpe United on a free transfer. Townsend scored his first goal for the club in a 6–0 win over Swindon Town on 28 March 2016. He played 88 games for Scunthorpe, scored five goals and was a crucial part of their push for play-offs in 2015–16, 2016–17 (where they lost to Millwall in the semi-finals) and 2017–18 (where they lost to Rotherham in the semi-finals).

West Bromwich Albion 
On 28 July 2018, Scunthorpe sold Townsend to West Bromwich Albion for £750,000, after Scunthorpe rejected bids from Hull and Ipswich Town. He signed a three-year deal. 

Conor Townsend scored in the 67th minute against Luton on Saturday 14th January 2023

Career statistics

References

External links
Conor Townsend profile at Sky Sports.

1993 births
Living people
People from Hessle
Footballers from the East Riding of Yorkshire
English footballers
Association football fullbacks
Hull City A.F.C. players
Grimsby Town F.C. players
Chesterfield F.C. players
Carlisle United F.C. players
English Football League players
National League (English football) players
Dundee United F.C. players
Scunthorpe United F.C. players
Scottish Professional Football League players
West Bromwich Albion F.C. players
Premier League players